Per Gunnar Haugen (born 20 April 1970) is a Norwegian windsurfer. He was born in Oslo. He participated in the Lechner A-390 class at the 1992 Summer Olympics in Barcelona, where he placed 22nd.

References

1970 births
Living people
Sportspeople from Oslo
Norwegian windsurfers
Olympic sailors of Norway
Norwegian male sailors (sport)
Sailors at the 1992 Summer Olympics – Lechner A-390